The Mobarak Mosque in The Hague is the first purpose-built mosque in the Netherlands.

The Ahmadiyya Muslim Community came to the Netherlands in 1947 and Qudrat-Ullah Hafiz was the first missionary. The mosque designed by Frits Beck. Its foundation stone was laid by Sir Muhammad Zafarullah Khan on 20 May 1955 who later inaugurated the mosque on 9 December 1955.

In July 1963, two small gold-plated minaret-turrets rising 2 metres above the building were built after approval was granted in February 1963.

On the morning of 8 August 1987, the mosque was almost burnt down by someone who presented themselves as a "Sunni Muslim". The individual claimed that the mosque did not preach "true Islam" and that he felt that "something had to be done". After the fire, the mosque had dilapidated appearance and was in need of renovation. The community leaders approached an Ahmadi architect, Abdul Rashid from London, as he had been designing mosques for many Ahmadiyya missions around the world without charge. The municipality gave a permit on 22 February 1995. Construction began by a group of volunteers on 29 May 1996 when the foundation stone for renovation and enlargement was laid by the fourth caliph of the community, Mirza Tahir Ahmad. The extension officially opened on 30 October 1998.

Construction of the minaret started early 2005 and was officially opened on 9 December 2005.

On 3 June 2006 Queen Beatrix of the Netherlands had visited the Mobarak Mosque to commemorate the building's 50th anniversary.

See also
Ahmadiyya
Islam in the Netherlands
List of mosques in the Netherlands
List of first mosques by country

References

Mosques completed in 1955
20th-century mosques
Ahmadiyya mosques in the Netherlands
Buildings and structures in The Hague
1955 establishments in the Netherlands
20th-century religious buildings and structures in the Netherlands